Rock music of West Bengal originated in Kolkata, West Bengal, India. The first Bengali rock band in West Bengal and India was Moheener Ghoraguli. In modern times, in this type of music distorted electric guitars, bass guitar, and drums are used, sometimes accompanied with pianos and keyboards. In early times the instruments used in modern times were also accompanied by saxophone, flute, violin and bass violin.

History

Origin (1960s–1970s) 

Bengali rock in Kolkata originated when the first band Moheener Ghoraguli was formed in 1975 and played in many concerts. The band was inspired by Bob Dylan and many other western artists. Their music was a mixture of a wide variety of influences, including the Baul and folk traditions of Bengali and rock.

Along with them, the Kolkata based English Rock Band called High (formed 1974) consisting of Late Dilip Balakrishnan (who was also part of the Great Bear rock band), Nondon Bagchi, Lew Hilt, Subhendu Chatterjee and Adi Irani started composing and performing Original Songs.A collection of the band's recordings were released on the Saregama label in 2009.

Emergence (1990s) 

Most of the Bengali rock bands in Kolkata were formed after the 1990s. The bands in this era started using many types of effects like distortion, wah wah, flanger, phaser, and delay in their music.

Krosswindz, a Bengali rock band based in Kolkata, India, was formed in 1990, and have played all over India and abroad, helping to urbanize and popularize the rock music of Bengal. Krosswindz have recorded ten albums, the highest number ever recorded by a Kolkatan rock band. The legendary Bengali rock band Abhilasha was also formed during this period. Their first album, a mixture of delightful rock and melody, was released by the original band members in 1997. Many bands like Bhoomi, Cactus, Parash Pathar, Chandrabindoo, Hip Pocket, Kalpurush, Fossils, and Lakkhichhara were formed later in this era. Fossils and Cactus have also brought Bengali metal into this era. Both Fossils and Cactus are regarded as the best Bengali hard rock bands, and they have toured all over India and abroad. All their albums and singles have been successful. This era also saw emergence of new bands like Udaan, Agantuk and others.

In 1994, the opening of Someplace Else (a pub which also hosts live music) changed the rock scene in Kolkata. Now it hosts live music for approximately nine hours every night.

New millennium (2000s) 
Many bands formed in the 2000s were influenced by guitar-heavy music. As metal became popular in the 2000s, many bands like Insomnia and Underground Authority started playing heavy metal and alternative music.

Chronic Xorn was the first band from Kolkata to record a heavy metal album. Death Destruction Sermon is their latest album, released in 2010, it consists of six tracks, and the full-length version of the album is 25 minutes 45 seconds.

As computer technology became more accessible and music software advanced in the 2000s, it became possible to create high quality music using little more than a single laptop computer. This resulted in a massive increase in the amount of home-produced electronic music available to the general public via the expanding internet. Many underground metal bands like Nitric Dreams and Crystal and the Witches from Kolkata also started recording and releasing singles on their blogs.

To encourage the Bengali rock scene, the Bangla Rock Magazine was started on 3 July 2013, covering exclusively Bengali rock.

See also

 Bangladeshi rock
 Indian rock

References

Further reading 

 
 
 
 
 
 
 
 
 
 
 
 
 
 
 
 
 
 

20th-century music genres
21st-century music genres
Bengali music
Indian music
Rock music genres
Music of Bengal